The 1958 Liège–Bastogne–Liège was the 44th edition of the Liège–Bastogne–Liège cycle race and was held on 27 April 1958. The race started and finished in Liège. The race was won by Fred De Bruyne of the Carpano team.

General classification

References

1958
1958 in Belgian sport
1958 Challenge Desgrange-Colombo
April 1958 sports events in Europe